Cullen is a rural village in County Tipperary, Ireland. The centre of the village is located at a junction of two roads in south Tipperary. These roads lead to Monard, Lattin, the "Rocky Road" and Oola respectively.

Name
The village was traditionally believed to have taken its name from the holly (Irish cuileann), although an Irish legend claimed that Fionn Mac Cumhail killed a hero named Cuileann, son of Morna at this site in the 3rd century AD. Another possible derivation is cuilleann, "steep unbroken slope;" the village is dominated by a sloping road.

Amenities
Cullen is home to two public houses (pubs), a cemetery and a Roman Catholic church. This church is dedicated to Saint Patrick and was built .

Cullen–Lattin soccer pitch is the venue for the Cullen–Lattin soccer team. It is called this because the villages of Cullen and Lattin (approx. 4 miles from Cullen) are joined as one parish in the Archdiocese of Cashel and Emly.

Sport
The GAA affiliations of the joint parish is concentrated in the village of Lattin; the team called Lattin–Cullen (to differentiate with the soccer team Cullen–Lattin). 

Cullen is also part of the shooting club known as "E.L.C.O. Gun Club" (Emly, Lattin, Cullen, Oola Gun club). This gun club is open for membership to residents and former residents of the lands within the E.L.C.O. area.

Archaeology
Longstone Rath and the Golden Bog of Cullen are nearby historic sites.

People
Nicky English, the former Tipperary hurler and manager, was born and raised in Cullen, living in what was a small shop run by his parents.

See also
 List of towns and villages in Ireland

References

Towns and villages in County Tipperary